Dolgopyat (Cyrillic: Долгопят) is a surname. Notable people with the surname include:

 Artem Dolgopyat (born 1997), Israeli gymnast
 Dmitry Dolgopyat (born 1972), Russian-American mathematician

See also
 

East Slavic-language surnames